"Apache Rocks the Bottom!" is a 2005 single by German techno group Scooter. It was released as the second and last single from the album Who's Got the Last Laugh Now? on 30 December 2005. The song is a mix of two songs from the album: "Apache" and "Rock Bottom".

Track listing
CD Single
"Apache Rocks The Bottom!" (Radio Edit) (3:45)
"Apache Rocks The Bottom!" (Extended Mix) (5:47)
"Apache Rocks The Bottom!" (Dub Mix) (5:57)
"Apache Rocks The Bottom!" (Club Mix) (5:30)
"Apache Rocks The Bottom!" (Snippet) (0:30)
"Countdown" (1:41)

12"
"Apache Rocks The Bottom!" (Extended Mix) (5:47)
"Countdown" (1:41)
"Apache Rocks The Bottom!" (Dub Mix) (5:57)
"Apache Rocks The Bottom!" (Club Mix) (5:30)

Download
"Apache Rocks The Bottom!" (Radio Edit) (3:45)
"Apache Rocks The Bottom!" (Extended Mix) (5:47)
"Apache Rocks The Bottom!" (Dub Mix) (5:57)
"Apache Rocks The Bottom!" (Club Mix) (5:30)
"Countdown" (1:41)

Digidance, Netherlands
"Rock Bottom" (Radio Mix) (3:25)
"Apache Rocks The Bottom!" (Radio Mix) (3:45)
"Rock Bottom" (Video Mix) (3:40)
"Countdown" (1:41)
"Rock Bottom" (Video) (3:40)

Samples
"Apache Rocks The Bottom!" samples the 1960 instrumental song "Apache" by The Shadows.

Charts

External links
"Apache Rocks The Bottom" Official Music Video
Scooter Official Site

References

Scooter (band) songs
2005 singles
Songs written by Jerry Lordan
Songs written by H.P. Baxxter
Songs written by Rick J. Jordan
Songs written by Jens Thele
2005 songs